Dangi (also Romanized as Dangī) is a village in Zamkan Rural District, in the Zamkan District of Salas-e Babajani County, Kermanshah Province, Iran. At the 2006 census, its population was 105, in 24 families.

References 

Populated places in Salas-e Babajani County